Neo-pop (also known as New Pop) is a postmodern art movement of the 1980s and 1990s.

Context 
Defined as a resurgence of the aesthetics and ideas from the mid-20th century movement capturing the characteristics of Pop art like intentional kitsch and interest in commercialism.

Notable artists 
The term (which originated in 1992 by Japanese critic Noi Sawaragi) refers to artists influenced by pop art and popular culture imagery, such as Jeff Koons, but also artists working in graffiti and cartoon art, such as Keith Haring. 

Japanese artist Takashi Murakami is described as the first of the Japanese neo-pop artists to "break the ice in terms of recycling Japanese pop culture". Japanese neo-pop is associated with the otaku subculture and the obsessive interests in anime, manga and other forms of pop culture. Artists such as Kenji Yanobe exemplify this approach to art and fandom.

See also 
 Camp (style)
 Vaporwave
 Superflat
 Dada

References

External links
Fantasy meets tragedy in Mr.’s Japanese Neo-Pop Art
Definition

Contemporary art
Postmodern art
1980s in art
1990s in art
Japanese art
American art
Pop art